Glyphipterix perimetalla is a species of sedge moth in the genus Glyphipterix. It was described by Oswald Bertram Lower in 1905. It is found in Australia, including Victoria.

References

Moths described in 1905
Glyphipterigidae
Moths of Australia